The C.I.D. Investigators are characters in Joseph Heller's classic 1961 novel Catch-22.

Overview
While the protagonist Yossarian is in the hospital during the opening of the novel, he is forced to censor letters written by enlisted men in the same hospital.  This soon becomes monotonous and he begins censoring at random.  To these documents that he has ravaged, he signs Washington Irving or, alternatively, Irving Washington.  A C.I.D. man, the military's version of a CIA or FBI agent, disguises himself as a patient and goes undercover in Yossarian's hospital, in order to determine the culprit for the over-zealous censorship. 

All the other patients soon know the C.I.D. man's identity as he secretly confides in everyone. He further gives away his special status after he refuses to censor any more letters after doing it for a day. When the other patients are scared away by The Texan and leave hospital, the C.I.D. man remains as he has caught pneumonia. Yossarian considers this C.I.D. man as "pretty lucky, because outside the hospital the war was still going on".

Major Major
Later, Major Major begins signing documents as Washington Irving, having heard about the C.I.D. man trying to catch the man censoring documents and signing them Washington Irving in the hospital.  When Washington Irving grows monotonous, Major Major switches to Irving Washington; later on, he adds his own twist to the device, signing John Milton and Milton John (observing as he does the comparative brevity of 'John Milton' will increase his signing turnover) before eventually returning to Washington Irving.  Eventually, a second C.I.D. man is dispatched, and very soon begin confiding their secret identities to every individual on the base on the condition that they (the individuals) tell no one else. As a result, the situation soon arrives that everyone on the base knows of the presence of two C.I.D. men, with the exception of the C.I.D. men themselves.

Their respective investigations proceed a series of complex mistakes.  The second C.I.D. man suspects Sergeant Towser, Major Major's secretary because, in organising a meeting between Major Major and the second C.I.D. man, he glibly revealed the latter's identity, despite the fact that there was little alternative in arranging the meeting.  The first C.I.D. man, having witnessed the meeting in question, comes to suspect the second C.I.D. man, and resolves to go undercover in the hospital to observe him.  His attempts to be listed as sick fail, until, dejected by his failure, he accidentally falls into a ditch and breaks his nose.

The Chaplain
Eventually, the prime suspect in the case turns out (incorrectly) to be Chaplain Tappman as Yossarian once, during his initial censorship campaign, forged the Chaplain's name following the words, "I yearn for you tragically" on a letter from which he had already censored all text except for the letter's opening: "Dear Mary,".

Representation
The C.I.D. men appear to represent dichotomies existent in American and bureaucratic culture.  The first is that innocuous or harmless crimes are sometimes investigated by the government instead of more serious ones.  The second is that society or organizational control systems (i.e. bureaucracy) care more about punishing someone for a perceived crime than making sure that the person actually committed the crime.

Catch-22 characters
Fictional secret agents and spies